Brimore is the base station of the famous peak, Agasthyarkoodam in the Agasthya hills of Trivandrum district, which is the capital of Kerala, India. The Agasthya hill range is famous for its abundance of rare herbs and medicinal plants. 
There is a tea estate in Brimore, established by the British.

Geography of Thiruvananthapuram